Providence Plantation can refers to:

 Providence Plantations, an English colonial settlement in Rhode Island, the United States
 Providence Plantation and Farm, a historic landmark site in Virginia, the United States